A blackhouse is a traditional type of thatched house in the Scottish Highlands. 

Black House or Blackhouse may refer to:

Miscellaneous
Blackhouse (band), a Christian industrial band
 Black House (novel), a 2001 horror novel by Stephen King and Peter Straub
The Blackhouse (novel), a 2011 novel by Peter May
 Black House (film), a 2007 South Korean film, based on a Japanese book of the same name
 Black House (Church of Satan), historic headquarters of the Church of Satan
 Black House, Lviv, a Renaissance building on Lviv Market Square in Ukraine
 Black House (MMA), a martial arts team and gym in Rio de Janeiro, Brazil
 Headquarters of the British Union of Fascists
 The Black House, a 1981 story collection by Patricia Highsmith
 The Black House (album), a 2003 album by black metal band Krieg

Places

United Kingdom
Blackhouse, Aberdeenshire, a United Kingdom location

United States

Hugo Black House, Ashland, Alabama, listed on the National Register of Historic Places (NRHP)
Arthur F. Black House, Kingman, Arizona, NRHP-listed
Benjamin Clayton Black House, Searcy, Arizona, NRHP-listed
William Black Family House, Brinkley, Arkansas, NRHP-listed
William Black House (La Jolla, California), NRHP-listed
Mary C. W. Black Studio House, Monterey, California, NRHP-listed
Samuel M. Black House, Salinas, California, NRHP-listed
Black House (Church of Satan), headquarters of the Church of Satan in San Francisco, California
Dr. John A. Black House Complex, Pueblo, Colorado, NRHP-listed in Pueblo County
Grant-Black House, New Orleans, Louisiana, NRHP-listed in Orleans Parish
Black Mansion, Ellsworth, Maine, NRHP-listed
William L. Black House, Hammonton, New Jersey, NRHP-listed in Atlantic County
J.C. Black House, Carthage, North Carolina, NRHP-listed
Black-Cole House, Eastwood, North Carolina, NRHP-listed
George Black House and Brickyard, Winston-Salem, North Carolina, NRHP-listed
Joseph Black Farmhouse, Circleville, Ohio, NRHP-listed in Pickaway County
Philip J. Black House, Loudonville, Ohio, NRHP-listed in Ashland County
Haller–Black House, Seaside, Oregon, NRHP-listed in Clatsop County
Dr. Walter Black House, Lake Oswego, Oregon, NRHP-listed in Clackamas County
William Black Homestead, New Cumberland, Pennsylvania, NRHP-listed
Black House (McMinnville, Tennessee), NRHP-listed
Thomas C. Black House, Murfreesboro, Tennessee, NRHP-listed
John M. Black Cabin, Ten Mile, Tennessee, NRHP-listed in Meigs County
E. B. Black House, Hereford, Texas, NRHP-listed in Deaf Smith County
John Black House, Beaver, Utah, NRHP-listed in Beaver County
Alfred L. Black House, Bellingham, Washington, NRHP-listed in Whatcom County
Merritt Black House, Kaukauna, Wisconsin, NRHP-listed

Elsewhere
 Baan Dam Museum, also known as the Black House, in Chiang Rai, Thailand